Snowmass may refer to:

Snowmass Village, Colorado, a town in Pitkin County, Colorado, U.S.
Snowmass (ski area)
 Snowmastodon site, an archaeological excavation near the town where well-preserved fossils of mammoths, mastodons, and plants were found in an ancient lakebed (subject of a 2012 Nova documentary)
Snowmass, Colorado, an unincorporated town in Pitkin County, Colorado, U.S.
Snowmass Mountain, a mountain in the Elk Mountains in Colorado, U.S.
Snowmass Process, the name of the Particle Physics Community Planning Exercise organized by the Division of Particles and Fields (DPF) of the American Physical Society about once per decade (most recently in 2020-2021).

See also
 Aspen/Snowmass, a ski resort complex